Cornel Patrichi (1 April 1944 – 5 April 2016) was a Romanian ballet dancer, choreographer, and actor.

Biography
Born in Bucharest in 1944, he attended School 18, near Piața Romană, and then completed high school (with specialty in choreography) in 1962. Upon graduation, he was hired as ballet dancer at the  Constantin Tănase Theater by his uncle, Nicolae Patrichi, the musical director of the theater. Starting in 1972 he was for ten years ballet dancer at the Fantasio Theater in Constanța.

He was married to Cornelia Patrichi, a ballerina, with whom he had a son, Alexandru. The two moved in 1987 to Italy, where they founded in Tuscany a ballet school, "Dance Studio Patrichi". In 1999 the couple returned to Romania, though their son remained in Italy.

Patrichi died in Bucharest in 2016 after a long battle with cancer, and was buried at Pipera Cemetery, in Voluntari.

Filmography

As choreographer
  (1970)
  (1972)
 The Actor and the Savages (1975)
 În pulberea de stele (1976)
  (1977)
  (1983)

As actor 
 Mens sana in corpore sano (1965)
  (1968)
  (1968)
  (1971)
 Veronica (1972)
  (1973)
  (1976)
  (1978)
  (1980)
  (1982)

References 

1944 births
2016 deaths
Entertainers from Bucharest
Romanian male ballet dancers
Romanian choreographers
Romanian actors
Romanian expatriates in Italy
Deaths from cancer in Romania